Qahreman Kandi (also Romanized as Qahremān Kandī; also known as Shāh Bandehlū) is a village in Avajiq-e Jonubi Rural District, Dashtaki District, Chaldoran County, West Azerbaijan Province, Iran. At the 2006 census, its population was 184, in 37 families.

References 

Populated places in Chaldoran County